Saulius Štombergas (born December 14, 1973)  is a retired Lithuanian professional basketball player, basketball coach and businessman. Štombergas is one of the greatest Lithuanian basketball players of all time, and he was also considered to be a great team leader, as he managed to play very well under pressure, and at the end of games. He was also known for his 3-point shooting ability.

Professional playing career

Club playing career
Štombergas' club teams during his playing career, were, in the order in which he played for them: Atletas Kaunas, Vostok Shanghai (Chinese CBA), Žalgiris Kaunas, Kinder Bologna, TAU Cerámica Vitoria, Efes Pilsen Istanbul, Unics Kazan, and Ülker Istanbul. He holds the record in the EuroLeague, since the year 2000, for the most 3-point field goals made in a game, without a miss.

National team playing career
Štombergas played for the senior men's Lithuanian national basketball team, from 1995 to 2004.

During the 11 years that he played as a Lithuanian international national team player, he played in 97 official games, and scored 1,036 points, for his home country. He won two bronze medals at the Summer Olympic Games, in 1996, and 2000. He also won a silver medal at the EuroBasket 1995, and as the captain of the senior national team, he won the gold medal of the same competition, in 2003. He was also named to the All-Tournament Team.

He also played at the EuroBasket 1997, the 1998 FIBA World Championship, the EuroBasket 1999, the EuroBasket 2001, and the 2004 Summer Olympic Games. He was the flag bearer for Team Lithuania, at the 2004 Olympics.

Coaching career
After he retired from playing professional basketball, Štombergas began his career as a basketball coach in 2011. He worked as a head coach for BC Žalgiris-2 in the NKL, before joining BC Žalgiris as an assistant coach for the 2012-2013 season. He briefly served as head coach in the 2013-2014 season, before resigning in April after disappointing results.

Career player statistics

EuroLeague

|-
| style="text-align:left;"| 2000–01
| style="text-align:left;"| TAU Cerámica
| 22 || 20 || 27.2 || .520 || .512 || .827 || 2.4 || .7 || .9 || .2 || 12.0 || 10.5
|-
| style="text-align:left;"| 2001–02
| style="text-align:left;"| Efes Pilsen
| 20 || 19 || 27.3 || .493 || .487 || .770 || 3.0 || 1.2 || 1.6 || .1 || 11.6 || 10.1
|-
| style="text-align:left;"| 2002–03
| style="text-align:left;"| Žalgiris
| 14 || 13 || 30.0 || .475 || .415 || .886 || 4.1 || 1.3 || .6 || .1 || 13.6 || 12.1
|-
| style="text-align:left;"| 2004–05
| style="text-align:left;"| Ülker
| 22 || 22 || 29.5 || .405 || .299 || .838 || 3.5 || 1.0 || 1.3 || .1 || 10.3 || 7.9
|-class="sortbottom"
| style="text-align:center;" colspan="2"| Career
| 78 || 74 || 28.5 || .469 || .420 || .825 || 3.2 || 1.0 || 1.2 || .1 || 11.7 || 10.0

Awards and honors

As a player

Pro clubs
 5× Lithuanian All-Star Game: 1995, 1996, 1998, 1999, 2003
 Lithuanian All-Star Game MVP: 1995
 FIBA Saporta Cup Champion: 1998 
 FIBA Saporta Cup Finals MVP: 1998
 FIBA Saporta Cup Finals Top Scorer: 1998
 3× Lithuanian League Champion: 1998, 1999, 2003
 FIBA EuroStar: 1998
 North European League Champion: 1999
 EuroLeague champion: 1999
 Spanish League All-Star Game: 2001
 2× Turkish Cup Winner: 2002, 2005
 Turkish League Champion: 2002
 FIBA Europe League (FIBA EuroChallenge) All-Star: 2004
 FIBA Europe League (FIBA EuroChallenge) Champion: 2004
 Turkish Super Cup Winner: 2004
 Turkish League All-Star Game: 2005

Lithuanian senior national team
1995 EuroBasket: 
1996 Summer Olympic Games: 
1998 Goodwill Games: 
2000 Summer Olympic Games: 
2003 EuroBasket: 
2003 EuroBasket: All-Tournament Team

References

External links 
Euroleague.net Profile
FIBA Profile
Eurobasket.com Profile
Spanish League Profile 
Italian League Profile 
Turkish League Profile

1973 births
Living people
Anadolu Efes S.K. players
Basketball players at the 1996 Summer Olympics
Basketball players at the 2000 Summer Olympics
Basketball players at the 2004 Summer Olympics
BC UNICS players
BC Žalgiris players
FIBA EuroBasket-winning players
Liga ACB players
Lithuanian expatriate basketball people in China
Lithuanian expatriate basketball people in Italy
Lithuanian expatriate basketball people in Russia
Lithuanian expatriate basketball people in Spain
Lithuanian expatriate basketball people in Turkey
Lithuanian men's basketball players
LSU-Atletas basketball players
Medalists at the 1996 Summer Olympics
Medalists at the 2000 Summer Olympics
Olympic basketball players of Lithuania
Olympic bronze medalists for Lithuania
Olympic medalists in basketball
Saski Baskonia players
Shanghai Sharks players
Small forwards
Basketball players from Klaipėda
Ülker G.S.K. basketball players
Virtus Bologna players
1998 FIBA World Championship players
Competitors at the 1998 Goodwill Games